The Scoundrel is a full-length Azerbaijani film shot in Baku in 1988. Directed by Vagif Mustafayev, this comedy film exposes the corruption and the decadence of the late Soviet bureaucracy in Azerbaijan SSR through the eyes of a naive Azerbaijani adult man, Hatem, played by Georgian actor Mamuka Kikaleishvili.

Cast

See also
Azerbaijani films of the 1980s

External links 

Soviet-era Azerbaijanian films
Azerbaijani-language films
Soviet comedy films
1988 comedy films
1988 films
Azerbaijanfilm films
Films directed by Vagif Mustafayev
Azerbaijani comedy films